Nestpick is an online platform for on-demand housing; month to month rentals of furnished apartments & rooms, operating worldwide. The website facilitates an easy exploration of a wide range of furnished apartments, rooms and student accommodation. Offers from many international providers are aggregated on the Nespick website. The service is targeted mainly at expats and students relocating nationally and internationally, searching for furnished mid- to long-term accommodation in unfamiliar cities.

Information is provided on the Nestpick website about each city, such as costs to expect when moving to the city, information about different areas of the city, and advice concerning student life in the city.

History

Nestpick was founded in Rotterdam in 2014 by German entrepreneur Fabian Dudek and Dutch tech entrepreneur Peter Hofman. Dudek founded Nestpick in response to his difficulty in finding appropriate student accommodation at the time of his studies. He perceived the role of agencies as negative as they were not really helping his search successfully and he was concerned with the high number of scams happening in the real estate market. Together with co-founder and CTO Peter Hofman they built the foundation of Nestpick and in December 2014 Dr. Patricia Moubarak, a former surgeon, Foodpanda director and McKinsey & Company principal, joined Nestpick as COO and co-founder.

The company experienced rapid expansion since its founding, culminating in Dudek winning two awards for young entrepreneurs in the Netherlands, and an investment from Berlin-based startup incubator Rocket Internet. The company subsequently moved from Rotterdam to Berlin. Nestpick added more cities and countries to its platform, resulting in a total of 25 cities and 8 countries in which the company offered its services. 2015 also saw the company criticised for failing to adhere to its own quality standards, vis-a-vis verification of listed properties.

Towards the middle of 2015, the company was restructured and began implementing a growth strategy. On 2 November 2015, nestpick closed its Series A funding, receiving €11 million USD from Mangrove Capital Partners, Target Global and Rocket Internet.

In April 2016, nestpick made 46 of its 66 employees redundant. Fabian Dudek and Patricia Moubarak left the company shortly afterwards, and the management of the company was passed over to Rocket Internet. Ömer Can Kücükdere (former managing director of Clickbus) became the CEO of Nestpick in August 2016.  Since then the business model of Nestpick has changed to its current one, being an international platform for furnished apartment rentals optimized specifically for expats and international students but also suitable for anyone wanting to rent month to month furnished apartments. Nestpick currently has 37 employees and is operating in more than 2000 cities worldwide.

Concept

Nestpick brings together mid- to long-term furnished properties providers and their international clientele on a metasearch engine, where furnished rentals can be easily compared.  Providers advertise real estate properties on a pay per click basis or pay per lead basis. Nestpick could be compared to any other aggregator websites such as Skyscanner or Trivago. Using this approach the company aims to streamline the rental process, allowing the tenant to rent a property safely from anywhere in the world without first making a viewing. Nestpick also provides information on its website about the cities it operates in.

Nestpick Studies 
Nestpick also conducts studies concerning cities internationally. Studies directed so far, compare cities with respect to LGBT, attractiveness to millennials and allure for professionals looking to work in startups. This is in the aim of providing a more full image of an unknown city compared to other international cities, in the interest of anyone looking to relocate.

Nestpick Scholarship 
Nestpick offers scholarships aimed to reward students worldwide, that are actively helping the community. This is in order to help students with their accommodation costs which can often be burdensome.

Competitors

Nestpick doesn't currently have any direct competitors, apart from every other person in the world renting furbished apartments.

Locations

As of July 2017 Nestpick is active in 33 countries and available in English, Spanish, German, French and Italian.

References

External links
nestpick homepage

Companies based in Berlin
Internet properties established in 2014
Freelance marketplace websites
Renting
Online marketplaces of Germany